Rosie and Jim (sometimes written as Rosie & Jim) is a British children's television programme which was produced by Ragdoll Productions and aired on ITV from 3 September 1990 to 16 May 2000. The programme was then repeated periodically on CITV until 23 July 2004. In January 2013, CITV aired the first episode, Locks, as part of the channel's 30th anniversary Old Skool Weekend.

Story
Rosie and Jim are two rag dolls who live aboard a narrowboat called the Ragdoll, which is from Birmingham. There, they sit with a concertina on their lap and come alive when no one is looking to explore the world that they pass by on rivers and canals across England. They learn to experience things by following the Ragdolls owner on his or her adventures, and secretly joining in with them. Usually, they end up causing trouble, but they are never detected because no one ever sees them.

Characters

Rosie
Rosie (puppeteered and voiced by Rebecca Nagan) is the female rag doll. During their adventures, she carries a bag that has her name written on it. She wears a yellow dress and has long shaggy black hair. She and Jim often refer to the boat driver as "fizzgog" (John Cunliffe), "loopy lobes" (or just "loopy"; Pat Hutchins) and "tootle" (Neil Brewer).  She sometimes calls Jim "Noggin". Her skin colour became a bit darker from series 2.

Jim
Jim (puppeteered and voiced by Robin Stevens) is the male rag doll. In their adventures, he can be seen carrying a notebook, in which he sometimes draws things that he has seen. He has short red hair and wears light brown trousers, a shirt with a red scarf, a white-with-red-stripes sock, brown boots and a brown waistcoat. The shade of his skin has changed slightly throughout the series.

Duck
Duck (also voiced by Robin Stevens) is an animatronic wooden model of a duck, who sits on top of the Ragdoll boat. He does not talk but can be heard quacking and flapping his wings when there are no humans around to let both Rosie and Jim know that the coast is clear. In some episodes, either Rosie or Jim give him a kiss. He is the only character to directly interact with all three presenters (as only Cunliffe directly addressed Rosie and Jim).

Narrowboat owners
Rosie and Jim's home is the narrowboat Ragdoll. Throughout its run the boat was acquired by three owners, each one playing a role according to their real-life profession.

 John "Fizzgog" Cunliffe: 1990–1991, 50 episodes
An author who writes stories about Rosie and Jim based upon his own everyday outings. Cunliffe is the only presenter to break the fourth wall, delivering pieces to the camera and narration throughout every episode, which ended with a self-penned short cutout animated story done by Alan Rogers and Peter Lang (creators of Pigeon Street). He is the only presenter to directly address Rosie and Jim on-screen.

 Pat "Loopy Lobes" Hutchins: 1995–1996, 45 episodes
An illustrator who creates pictures, gathering ideas from her adventures. Each episode would start with Pat finishing a drawing of Rosie and Jim and end with an illustration, again by Pat, based upon the episode. At the end of each episode, Duck would be hidden in the picture, with Rosie and Jim trying to find him. Pat also illustrated the books and artwork for the video releases between 1995 and 1996. Hutchins is the only female presenter of the series.

 Neil "Tootle" Brewer: 1997–2000, 80 episodes 
A singer and musician who plays the harmonica and the concertina. Neil would begin each episode looking for his harmonica followed by Rosie and Jim talking about and introducing him. Brewer would often end each episode with a song played on his concertina; prompted by Rosie and Jim who would leave the instrument for him to play, next to Duck. At the end of each episode, the rag dolls would often join in with the song, unknown to Neil. Brewer became the longest-serving owner of the boat and was the only one to star in a live theatre tour of the show in 1999 and 2000. Brewer is the only presenter to have starred in more than 2 series. He is also the last surviving presenter, following the death of Pat Hutchins in November 2017, and that of John Cunliffe in September 2018.

Following the boat's redundancy from Ragdoll Productions, it is no longer on display to the public.

Episodes

Series 1 (1990–1991) – John Cunliffe
1. Locks – 3 September 1990
2. Painting – 10 September 1990 – Tree branches scrape against the Ragdoll, scratching off its smart paint. So John goes out to the shops to buy some paint to make his boat look nice and shiny again. Rosie and Jim do some painting of their own, and they learn about mixing colours together to make even more colours.
3. Supermarket – 17 September 1990 – John is out of groceries, so he makes a trip to Sainsbury's to purchase what he needs. The two rag dolls have something different on their minds...
4. Tunnel – 24 September 1990 –  Whilst John is on his travels, he goes inside a tunnel leaving the two rag dolls to believe that pure darkness can be frightening to travel through.
5. Horse Towing – 1 October 1990
6. Glass – 8 October 1990 – John is very curious as to know how glass is made, so he goes to a factory to see what ingredients are put together to make glass, sand being the main one. Rosie and Jim follow him there, and play in the sandpit making their own boat out of sand with marble glass windows.
7. Boat Building – 15 October 1990
8. Washing – 22 October 1990 – It's a rainy day on the Ragdoll, and John's in need of washing his clothes, so he sets out to a local launderette to get them clean once again. Rosie and Jim have some dirty washing too, but they have something else in mind...
9. Coal – 29 October 1990 - It is quite cold on the Ragdoll, and John is running out of coal for his furnace to keep him and Rosie and Jim warm, so he and Rosie and Jim set out to a coal mine to see where exactly coal comes from.
10. Clipping – 5 November 1990 - As John sails down the canal, he notices lots of different things being cut, so he takes a walk and goes to a farm to see some sheep having their wool sheared off. Later on, John does some trimming of his own by giving his beard a snip. Rosie and Jim join in by taking some sheep wool and begin pretending to shear it off themselves.
11. Falcons – 12 November 1990 - John is looking for an idea for a story, so he sails down the canal to a falcon country park to see all kinds of different birds. Rosie and Jim follow him, and watch the demonstrations of the falcons.
12. Woollen Mill – 19 November 1990 - John's woolly jumper is beginning to wear out, so he sets off to a mill to retrieve some wool to knit a new jumper. Meanwhile, Jim mistakes a sheep for a dragon, and is frightened... but soon learns that sheep are harmless. Then Rosie and Jim finally get some coloured wool of their own to snuggle with.
13. Bread – 26 November 1990 - John sets out to a wheat field to find out how bread is made. He then sees a windmill, and is shown how wheat is turned into bread. Rosie and Jim get up to their old tricks and fool around with John when he isn't looking.
14. Shopping – 3 December 1990 – John sets out to the shops to but some food and drink for a picnic. Rosie and Jim are hungry and want to have a picnic too, so they add their own items to John's shopping list without him knowing. Bearing in mind that John doesn't even like the items that Rosie and Jim added, they're afraid that John is going to be cross.
15. Weaving – 10 December 1990 – John thinks his bed blanket is starting to wear out on him, so he decides to go and get a new one. Rosie and Jim play with his blanket, but they play too rough, and put large holes in it. So John pays a visit to the weavers workshop to see how blankets are made from scratch.
16. Ferry – 17 December 1990 – John goes off to Hampton to see a ferry, when Rosie and Jim see a boat that's going to the same place as the Ragdoll, they fear that it's going to cause a crash, but of course, it didn't. John hops aboard a ferry to be transported from one path to another that has the river as a collision.
17. Milking (AKA "Milk") – 7 January 1991
18. Sailing – 14 January 1991
19. Steam – 21 January 1991
20. Abbey – 28 January 1991 – John gives Tewkesbury a visit so he can go into the Abbey and explore the inside of the church.
21. Breakdown – 4 February 1991
22. Pottery – 11 February 1991 – John travels to Pershore to visit a pottery
23. Fairground – 18 February 1991 – John travels along the River Severn through Worcester to Stourport
24. Letters – 25 February 1991 – John travels to Worcester to visit the Worcester Post and Sorting Office
25. Finding the Way – 4 March 1991 – John travels along the River Severn through Worcester then he goes to Ragley Hall in Alcester to a maze

Series 2 (1991–1992) – John Cunliffe
26. Automata – 30 September 1991 – John visits Ashorne Hall to see some musical instruments
27. Butterflies – 7 October 1991 –  John visits Stratford Butterfly Farm in Stratford-upon-Avon
28. Houses – 14 October 1991 – John Visits Charlecote House In Charlecote
29. Hair – 21 October 1991 – John visits Renoir Hair Salon in Birmingham
30. School – 28 October 1991 – John visits Reaside Nursery School in Birmingham
31. Bricks – 4 November 1991 – John visits Northcot Brick Ltd in Blockley
32. Small Animals – 11 November 1991 – John visits Evesham from Stratford-upon-Avon to see some small animals at Twyford Country Centre
33. Hats – 18 November 1991 – John visits The Rag Market in Birmingham
34. Hospital – 25 November 1991 – John visits Birmingham Children's Hospital in Birmingham
35. Boat Painting – 2 December 1991 – John visits The National Waterways Museum in Gloucester
36. Sheepdog – 9 December 1991 – John visits Netherly Farm in Mathon to see a sheepdog
37. Waterworks – 16 December 1991 – John visits Severn Trent Water
38. Blacksmith – 6 January 1992 – John visits The National Waterways Museum in Gloucester
39. Library – 13 January 1992 – John visits The Children's Library in Sutton Coldfield
40. Dredging – 20 January 1992
41. Rope – 27 January 1992 – John visits Bewdley to get a new rope for The Ragdoll Boat
42. Trees – 3 February 1992
43. Shoes – 10 February 1992 – John visits Worcester to buy some shoes from Blunts Shoes
44. Brass – 17 February 1992
45. Flying – 24 February 1992 – John visits Bidford-on-Avon to learn to fly in a plane at Avon Soaring Centre
46. Coracle – 2 March 1992
47. Puppet Show – 9 March 1992 – John visits the Swan Theatre in Stratford-upon-Avon to  see a puppet show performed by Major Mustard
48. Shire Horses – 16 March 1992 – John visits Stratford-upon-Avon to visit the Stratford Shire Horse Centre
49. Eggs – 23 March 1992 – John visits A E Beckett and Sons at Heath Farm in Wythall to see where eggs come from
50. Boat Festival – 30 March 1992 – John visits a boat festival on his last day of owning the Ragdoll before being replaced by Pat Hutchins.

Series 3 (1995) – Pat Hutchins
51. Radio Station – 6 January 1995 – Pat Hutchins visits BBC CWR radio studios in Coventry
52. Babies – 13 January 1995 – Pat visits Hillfields Nursery Centre
53. Steam Train – 20 January 1995 – Pat visits the Battlefield Line Railway
54. Barn Owl – 27 January 1995
55. Gingerbread Man – 3 February 1995 – Pat visits Coggans Bakery in Nuneaton to see how gingerbread men are made
56. Musical Instruments – 10 February 1995 – Pat visits Leicester to meet Unity Brass
57. Flower Baskets – 17 February 1995 – Pat visits Mill Lane Nurseries in Evesham
58. Duck Gets Lost – 24 February 1995
59. Ten Pin Bowling – 3 March 1995 – Pat visits a bowling alley in Coventry
60. Sneezes – 10 March 1995 – Pat visits The Uppingham Road Health Centre in Leicester
61. Digging For Potatoes – 17 March 1995
62. Pony Riding – 24 March 1995
63. Lovely Bananas – 31 March 1995
64. Splish Splash Splosh – 7 April 1995
65. Down on the Farm – 21 April 1995
66. The Hat Factory – 28 April 1995 - Pat visits the Hat Factory and sees how hats are made, Rosie wanted a red hat and with some help from Jim they decorated a beautiful red hat for Rosie.
67. The Disappearing Sausages – 5 May 1995 - Pat's friends are going on a boating holiday, but Rosie and Jim wanted to go on a boating holiday too once they start packing up Jim wants to pack some sausages but Rosie refused and after they finished packing up they accidentally throw their suitcase on another boat and then got mixed up someone else suitcase.
68. Soapy Duck – 12 May 1995
69. Bouncy Castles – 19 May 1995
70. A Special Dance – 26 May 1995
71. Flood on the Boat – 9 June 1995 - Pat had a glass of water then it run out so Rosie gives her another glass of water, but she had forgotten to turn the tap off at the sink while the water keeps going on the whole room was flooded with water. When Pat saw what happened, she asks a man with a tractor to take the Ragdoll boat out of the water and Rosie and Jim sees what was underneath the boat. When Rosie suddenly realised what she has done and with help from Jim, they managed to clean up and get the water off the boat and turn the tap off.
72. The Shoemaker – 16 June 1995
73. Scarecrow – 23 June 1995
74. Roller Skating – 30 June 1995
75. Stars at Night – 7 July 1995

Series 4 (1996) – Pat Hutchins
76. Acrobats – 5 January 1996 – Pat Visits a Circus in Stratford Upon Avon
77. Earrings – 12 January 1996
78. The Best Boat in the World – 19 January 1996 – Pat visits Stratford Upon Avon to have a ride in a Gondola
79. Mouse on the Boat – 26 January 1996
80. Floating Restaurant – 2 February 1996 - Pat visits a mobile restaurant on a boat with a beautiful dress and had dinner there. Pat ordered ice cream for pudding but Jim was so hungry and Rosie was serving the customers by giving them their ice-creams when Jim starts to eat Pat's special ice cream Rosie tries to take it away but Jim wants it and then they throw the ice cream right onto Pat's face.  
81. On Safari – 9 February 1996 – Pat visits Woburn Safari Park in Woburn
82. Exercise – 16 February 1996 – Pat visits The Metropolitan Club to do some exercise
83. Little Lost Kitten – 23 February 1996 – Pat finds a lost kitten and takes it back to a Family at Barton Dovecote Leisure
84. Stripes – 1 March 1996 – Pat visits Woburn Safari Park in Woburn to see some Stripes
85. Magical Lights – 8 March 1996 – Pat has been invited by the Lord Mayor of the town to help turn on the Christmas lights in Stratford Upon Avon
86. Making Pizza – 28 June 1996 – Pat visits Gourmet Pizza Company in Oxford
87. Shop Window – 5 July 1996 – Pat visits Oxford to help with a mannequin dummy
88. Visiting the Vet – 12 July 1996
89. Bus Ride – 19 July 1996
90. Dog Training – 26 July 1996
91. Winning the Race – 2 August 1996
92. The Milkman – 9 August 1996 - Pat visits the milkman to buy milk
93. Ballroom Dancing – 16 August 1996
94. The Umbrella Factory – 23 August 1996
95. Sleepy Baby – 30 August 1996 – Pat looks after a baby on her last day of owning the Ragdoll before being replaced by Neil Brewer.

Series 5 (1997) – Neil Brewer
96. Harmonica – 10 January 1997 - When Neil Brewer's harmonica slips out of his hand and fell into the children's water bowl and when he got it back it lost its toot, he went to a shop that sells musical instruments he tried out the violin, the electric guitar and then the drums. At last, he tried out the new harmonica and he thinks it's perfect.  
97. Spring Cleaning – 17 January 1997
98. Water Skiing – 24 January 1997
99. Cake – 31 January 1997
100. Sing Song – 7 February 1997
101. Pony And Trap – 14 February 1997
102. Ducks – 21 February 1997
103. Football – 28 February 1997 – Neil visits Bristol City Football Club to watch the 1996 Gloucestershire Cup match versus Bristol Rovers.
104. Chimney Sweep – 7 March 1997
105. Windy Day – 14 March 1997
106. A New Chair – 21 March 1997 - Rosie and Jim accidentally broke one of their chairs, it was in pieces so they followed Neil to the Woodland Workshop to learn how to make a chair.
107. Kites – 4 April 1997
108. A Jacket For Neil – 11 April 1997 - Neil visits a tailor shop to get a new jacket, but with help from Rosie and Jim, the tailor-made a jacket for Neil. 
109. Hot Air Balloon – 18 April 1997 - Neil visits the 1996 Bristol International Balloon Festival
110. Bike Ride – 25 April 1997 – Neil visits The Lock Inn Bike Hire Centre to ride on a tricycle
111. Molly The Parrot – 9 May 1997
112. Beach – 16 May 1997
113. Roundabout – 23 May 1997 – Neil visits Brean Leisure Park to ride on a merry-go-round
114. Mattress – 30 May 1997
115. Theatre – 6 June 1997 – Neil visits the Bristol Old Vic Theatre Royal

Series 6 (1998) – Neil Brewer
116. Oodles Of Noodles – 5 January 1998
117. Pigeons – 9 January 1998 – Neil visits Trafalgar Square in London to meet some pigeons
118. Camping – 12 January 1998
119. Big Ben Boing – 16 January 1998 – Neil visits Big Ben in Westminster, London
120. Golf – 19 January 1998 – Neil plays golf with Neil Jordan at Sudbury Golf Course.
121. Tower of London – 23 January 1998 – Neil visits the Tower of London
122. Newspaper – 26 January 1998
123. Waterslide – 30 January 1998
124. Fish Face – 2 February 1998 – Neil visits London Aquarium to meet some fish
125. Stilts – 6 February 1998
126. Do It Yourself – 9 February 1998
127. Tomato Ketchup – 13 February 1998 – Neil visits a tomato ketchup factory to see how ketchup is made
128. Lullaby – 16 February 1998
129. Driftwood – 20 February 1998 - Duck finds himself floating away on some driftwood when Rosie and Jim accidentally push him off the boat.
130. Tower Bridge – 23 February 1998 – Neil visits Tower Bridge to see how it works
131. Music Boat – 27 February 1998
132. Recording Studio – 2 March 1998 - Neil performs a new song with composer Andrew McCrorie-Shand
133. One Man Band – 6 March 1998
134. Chinese Lion Dance – 9 March 1998
135. Music Party – 13 March 1998

(Newspaper and Lullaby have not been readily available in any format since their initial broadcasts in 1998 and have been presumed missing)

Series 7 (1999) – Neil Brewer
136. Sticky Honey – 5 January 1999 – Neil visits a honey farm to see how it is made
137. Chainmaking – 12 January 1999 – Neil has to replace the Ragdoll boat's anchor and chain after it sinks into the water.
138. Shining Armour – 19 January 1999
139. Naughty Little Frog – 26 January 1999 – A frog suddenly appears inside one of Neil's shoes, and Neil removes it from the boat, only for the frog to find itself inside Neil's hat, and later in his biscuit box.
140. Thatching – 2 February 1999
141. Sailing Boat – 9 February 1999
142. Drawing – 16 February 1999 – An artist is drawing the Ragdoll boat, but runs into several mishaps along the way, most notably Rosie and Jim continuously moving Duck around the boat.
143. Disco Boat – 23 February 1999
144. Radio Control – 2 March 1999 - Neil takes part in a remote control boat race in Daventry.
145. Keep Fit – 9 March 1999 – Neil decides to keep fit, but is startled when he sees what appears to be a ghost under a sheet, but turns out to be Rosie and Jim!
146. Dry Stone Walling – 16 March 1999
147. Baby Elephant – 23 March 1999
148. Washing Day – 30 March 1999
149. Lifeboat Rescue – 6 April 1999 – Neil calls the lifeboat rescue crew in Caister-on-Sea after Rosie and Jim untie the mooring ropes at the wrong end, sending the Ragdoll adrift.
150. Knitting Factory – 13 April 1999
151. Road Boat – 20 April 1999
152. Line Dancing – 27 April 1999 – Neil joins in a country western dance party at Lynroy's club in Loughborough.
153. Wallpaper – 4 May 1999
154. High Bar – 11 May 1999 – Neil visits the City of Birmingham Gymnastics Club.
155. Riding Lesson - 18 May 1999 - Neil learns to ride a horse at Bourne Vale Riding Stables in Birmingham, but is in for a surprise when Rosie accidentally jumps onto the back of his horse.

(A separate video made in association with British Waterways was also made in 1999, called Stay Safe Near Water with Rosie and Jim and Duck. In addition, Sailing Boat, Knitting Factory, Road Boat and Wallpaper have not been readily available since series 7 was repeated in 2004, and have been presumed missing.)

Series 8 (2000) – Neil Brewer
156. Disappearing Dog – 4 January 2000
157. Upside Down – 11 January 2000 – Neil is trying to find a bottle of glue to secure a loose floor tile, and vows to find it if he has to turn the Ragdoll boat upside down.
158. Where's My Wedding Ring – 18 January 2000
159. Mother's Day – 25 January 2000
160. Steel Band – 1 February 2000
161. Disappearing Trousers – 8 February 2000
162. Jumble Duck – 15 February 2000
163. Flour Trail – 22 February 2000
164. Birthday Party – 29 February 2000
165. Lots of Knots – 7 March 2000 - Neil has to replace the Ragdoll's front fender after it's caught in the wall of a lock.
166. Flashing Fire Engine – 14 March 2000 - Neil volunteers to be rescued by the Royal Berkshire Fire and Rescue Service as part of a fire safety demonstration.
167. Amazing Teddy –  21 March 2000
168. Rescue The Rubbish – 28 March 2000
169. Water, Water Everywhere – 4 April 2000
170. Hop to the Hospital – 11 April 2000 - Neil checks into the Royal Berkshire Hospital after spraining his ankle while mooring up the Ragdoll.
171. Lazy Day – 18 April 2000 – Neil decides he's had enough cruising for one day and decides to relax, but his day isn't as relaxing as he may have hoped.
172. The Window Cleaner – 25 April 2000
173. Little Ducklings – 2 May 2000
174. Runaway Roller Blades – 9 May 2000
175. The Magic Show – 16 May 2000 (Series finale)

Home media releases
Video Collection International released VHS tapes of the series. From 1991 until 1994, the tapes were released through the Central Video imprint, which then transitioned off to Carlton Home Entertainment's CTE Video imprint for a short time in the mid-'90s, before reverting to Video Collection International.

The Bumper Pack DVD was released by Platform Entertainment.

UK VHS releases

Australian VHS releases
 Roadshow Entertainment (1999-2003)

DVD
Rosie and Jim – Sticky Honey and Other Stories (released 4 March 2002)
Rosie and Jim – Flashing Fire Engine and Other Urgent Adventures (released 2004)
Rosie and Jim – Up, Up And Away and Other stories
Rosie and Jim – Bumper Pack 1 (released 28 March 2016)
Rosie and Jim – Bumper Pack 2 (released 3 October 2016)

References

External links
 Rosie and Jim website
 Ragdoll Productions website
 

1990 British television series debuts
2000 British television series endings
1990s British children's television series
2000s British children's television series
1990s preschool education television series
2000s preschool education television series
 British preschool education television series
 ITV children's television shows
 Television series by DHX Media
 Television series by ITV Studios
 Television series by Ragdoll Productions
 Sentient toys in fiction
 British children's musical television series
 British children's comedy television series
 Television shows set in the West Midlands (county)
Television shows set in Bristol
Television shows set in London
Television shows set in Berkshire
Television shows set in Somerset
Television shows set in Gloucestershire
Television shows set in Oxfordshire
Television shows set in Warwickshire
Television shows set in Northamptonshire
 English-language television shows
 British television shows featuring puppetry
 British television series with live action and animation
 Television shows produced by Central Independent Television
 Television duos